EDI may refer to:

Government
 European Deterrence Initiative, a US defense program for strengthening European defenses
 Federal Department of Home Affairs, the Swiss interior ministry

Media 
 Edi (film), a Polish film
 EDI (Mass Effect), a character in the original Mass Effect trilogy

People
 Edi (given name)
 E.D.I. Mean (born 1974), American rapper
 Guy Edi (born 1988), Ivorian-French basketball player

Technology
 EDI (software), an integrated development environment
 Electrodeionization, a water purification process
 Electronic data interchange, a data standard

Other uses
 Eating Disorder Inventory, a self-report questionnaire
 Edinburgh Airport (IATA code), in Scotland
 Equality, Diversity and Inclusion, an academic journal on these topics
 Evans-Deakin Industries, a former Australian engineering company
 UCL Eastman Dental Institute, of the University College London